Rybno  is a village in Działdowo County, Warmian-Masurian Voivodeship, in northern Poland. It is the seat of the gmina (administrative district) called Gmina Rybno.

The village has a population of 2,558.

References

Villages in Działdowo County